This is a complete list of members of the United States Senate during the 112th United States Congress listed by seniority from January 3, 2011, to January 3, 2013. It is a historical listing and will contain people who have not served the entire two-year Congress should anyone resign, die, or be expelled.

Order of service is based on the commencement of the senator's first term. Behind this is former service as a senator (only giving the senator seniority within his or her new incoming class), service as vice president, a House member, a cabinet secretary, or a governor of a state. The final factor is the population of the senator's state.

Senators who were sworn in during the middle of the two-year Congress (up until the last senator who was not sworn in early after winning the November 2012 election) are listed at the end of the list with no number.

In the 112th Congress, Tom Harkin is the most senior junior senator, and Jeanne Shaheen is the most junior senior senator.

Terms of service

U.S. Senate seniority list

See also
112th United States Congress
List of members of the United States House of Representatives in the 112th Congress by seniority

Notes

External links
Senate Seniority List

112
Senate Seniority